Bruno Batista Pereira Pires (born 12 May 1992), known as Bruno Pirri, is a Brazilian professional footballer who plays as a central defender for Spanish club CD Lugo.

Club career
On 6 September 2020, Pires joined China League One side Kunshan. On 4 August 2022, he moved to Spanish club CD Lugo in Segunda División, on a one-year deal.

References

1992 births
Living people
Brazilian footballers
Brazilian expatriate footballers
Club Athletico Paranaense players
União Agrícola Barbarense Futebol Clube players
Figueirense FC players
Chiapas F.C. footballers
Cafetaleros de Chiapas footballers
Ceará Sporting Club players
Vitória F.C. players
Kunshan F.C. players
CD Lugo players
Campeonato Brasileiro Série B players
Liga MX players
Ascenso MX players
Primeira Liga players
China League One players
Brazilian expatriate sportspeople in Mexico
Brazilian expatriate sportspeople in Portugal
Brazilian expatriate sportspeople in China
Brazilian expatriate sportspeople in Spain
Expatriate footballers in Mexico
Expatriate footballers in Portugal
Expatriate footballers in China
Expatriate footballers in Spain
Association football defenders